Aminata Camara (born 6 December 1973) is a retired Malian hurdler. She competed at the 1996 Olympic Games and the 1997 World Indoor Championships without reaching the final. Her personal best time was 14.94 seconds, achieved at the 1996 Summer Olympics.

References

1973 births
Living people
Malian female hurdlers
Athletes (track and field) at the 1996 Summer Olympics
Olympic athletes of Mali
21st-century Malian people